Matthew Monahan (born 1972) is an American contemporary artist based in Los Angeles.

Monahan graduated from Cooper Union School of Art in 1994 with a BFA and the De Ateliers in Amsterdam from 1994 to 1996.

Monahan has shown his sculptures at various galleries, collections, and museums, including the Los Angeles Museum of Contemporary Art, the Chinese European Art Center in Xiamen, Bureau Stedelijk in Amsterdam, The National Center for Art in St. Petersburg, Russia, the Royal Academy and the Saatchi Gallery in London, and Museum Boijmans Van Beuningen, The Stedelijk Museum and the Fries Museum, all in the Netherlands.

In 1999, Monahan participated in both the Liverpool and LA International Biennials.

References

Further reading 

 Jonathan Griffin (October 2007). Matthew Monahan: Sculpture and anthropology from the school of hard knocks. Frieze.
 Vitamin 3-D : new perspectives in sculpture and installation. .
 [s.n.] (2010). Matthew Monahan [Museum of Contemporary Art, Los Angeles, 26 July - 27 October 2007]. Museum of Contemporary Art. .
 Elena Filipovic (2010) Creamier: contemporary art in culture: 10 curators, 100 contemporary artists, 10 sources. Phaidon. .
 Review in The New York Times
 

1972 births
Sculptors from California
People from Eureka, California
Living people